Dunhill may refer to:

People
 Alfred Dunhill (1872–1959), founder of the luxury goods company Alfred Dunhill Ltd.
 Alison Dunhill (born 1950), English artist and art historian
 Thomas Dunhill (1877–1946), English composer and writer

Places
 Dunhill, County Waterford, a town in County Waterford, Ireland

Retail brands
 Alfred Dunhill Ltd., a British luxury goods company owned by Richemont
 Dunhill (cigar), a brand of cigars owned by British American Tobacco
 Dunhill (cigarette), a brand of luxury cigarettes owned by British American Tobacco

Sports and entertainment
 Dunhill Records, a record label (later ABC/Dunhill Records)
 Alfred Dunhill Cup, a former golf event
 Alfred Dunhill Links Championship, a golf event
 The Dunhill Trio, American dancers

Other
 Dunhill Hotel in Charlotte, North Carolina